In television encryption, Cryptoworks is a DVB conditional access system, developed by Philips CryptoTec but now belonging to Irdeto.

Cryptoworks is used by the following pay TV providers:
OSN
Digiturk
the BFBS satellite service
UPC Direct
ITV Partner
ORF
Skylink
JSTV
Ziggo 

It is also used to encrypt some feeds to cable television head-ends.

In 2006, Cryptoworks was transferred to Irdeto.

Other conditional access systems include Irdeto, VideoGuard, Nagravision, Mediaguard

References

Digital television
Conditional-access television broadcasting